Andrei Stratan (born 3 September 1966) is a Moldovan politician.

He was the Deputy Prime Minister and  Minister of Foreign Affairs and European Integration in the Vasile Tarlev Cabinet and the Zinaida Greceanîi Cabinets.

References

1966 births
Living people
Foreign ministers of Moldova
Deputy Prime Ministers of Moldova
Moldovan MPs 2009